Afridi Adam Khel is one of the 8 clans of the Afridi tribe that originated in the Pashtun region of modern-day Afghanistan and Pakistan.

Afridi Adam Khel origin is Tirah valley like other Afridi clans, Adam Khel area in Tirah is known as Tirah Adam Khel, where Jawaki and Kala Khel(Hassan Khel) sub sections of Adam Khel still have presence but most of the Afridi Adam Khel are migrated long back to FR Peshawar and FR Kohat.

Afridi Adam Khel have presence in following tribal areas of Pakistan.

1 - FR Peshawar.

2 - FR Kohat.

3 - Maidan Tirah vallay - Khyber agency.

Afridi Adam Khel like other Afridi clans share a common ancestry, however there are some small groups of people of unknown origin living alongside Afridi's since long time, these people are called Hamsayas in Afridi slang (protected people) like, Nayan etc.

Afridi Adam Khel is divided further into 3 main sections:- 

Jawaki(FR Peshawar, FR Kohat, Jawaki of Tirah valley Khyber agency)
Gallai(Dara Adam Khel FR Kohat)
Hassan Khel(FR Peshawar, FR Kohat Dara Adam Khel)
Adam had 2 wives, Khatoun (4 SONS) and Ayesha(1 SON), Ayesha's son was named Ali. 
Kala Khel(sub section of HASSAN KHEL) and Jawaki of Tirah are the 2 sub-sections of Tirah Adam khel. Tribesmen of  Kala khel and Jawaki still have a presence in the Tirah Valley.
Adam Khel Tribesmen of FR KOHAT and FR PESHAWAR migrated long back to their present location FR Peshawar and FR Kohat and have no presence in the Tirah valley.

Some of Afridi Adam Khels are settled out side tribal areas.

Jawaki is the clan of Adam Khel who have presence in FR Kohat, FR Peshawar and in Tirah valley.

Jawaki living in FR Peshawar are known as Seri Jawaki, Jawaki of FR Kohat are known as Pitao Jawaki, while Jawaki of Khyber agency is called Tirah Jawaki, these names are given to Jawakis based on their locations in tribal areas.

Jawaki-Adam Khel is further divided into 4 sub sections

Kimat Khel - Area (FR Kohat, Tirah Vallay)
Hibat Khel - Area (FR Peshawar - Bora, FR Kohat, Tirah vallay)
Bazi Khel - Area (FR Kohat Jawaki, FR Kohat Darra Adam Khel, Bazi Khel of Tirah vallay, Bazi Khel village near Kohat tunnel)
 Raman Khel - Area ( Tirah Valley)

Some of Bazi Khel Jawaki are also settled in Dara Adam Khel also.

Ismail Khel(Kimat Khel), Hibat Khel and Bazi Khel are sub sections of Jawaki of Tirah.

> Gallai is another Afridi Adam Khel clan, Gallai Adam Khel home is Dara Adam Khel FR Kohat, a town famous for gun factories.

Gallai Adam Khel have no presence in Tirah vallay Khyber agency unlike Jawaki and Kala Khel (Hassan Khel), they migrated long back from Tirah Adam Khel.

Gallai-Adam Khel is further divided into 4 sub section, whole Gallai tribe lives in Dara Adam Khel FR Kohat

Bosti Khel 
Yaghi Khel - Tor Sappar
Sheraki
Zarghoon Khel

> Hassan Khel is the 3rd clan of Afridi Adam Khel, Hassan Khel Adam Khel home is FR Peshawar, Kala Khel a sub section of Hassan Khel have presence in Tirah vallay also.

Hassan Khel-Adam Khel is further divided into following sub sections.

Akor wal - Area - Dara Adam Khel FR Kohat
Janakori - Area - FR Peshawar
Ashu Khel - Area - FR Peshawar and sub section of Ashu Khel(Kala Khel) lives in Tirah valley

Karlani Pashtun tribes
Pashto-language surnames
Pakistani names

http://fatapakistan.blogspot.com/2011/09/afridi-tribe-of-khyber-darra-adam-khel.html?m=1